Keith John Jeffery MRIA  (11 January 1952 – 12 February 2016) was a Northern Irish historian specialising in modern British, British Imperial, and Irish history.

Early life
He attended Methodist College Belfast, where his father was vice principal.

Career
Having obtained his BA, MA, and PhD (1978) degrees from St. John's College, Cambridge, the latter under the supervision of John Andrew Gallagher, he was Professor of British history at Queen's University Belfast. In 1998, Jeffery served as the Lees Knowles Lecturer at Trinity College, Cambridge, and in 2003–4 the Parnell Fellow in Irish Studies at Magdalene College, Cambridge. He also held visiting positions at the Australian National University, the Australian Defence Force Academy and Deakin University. 

Although much of his work was devoted to military history, his research more recently focused on the history of intelligence gathering.  In 2005, he was commissioned by the British Secret Intelligence Service (MI6) to write an authorised history for the organisation's centenary, covering its founding in 1909 up through to 1949. John Scarlett, head of MI6 at the end of that period, said credibility required that Jeffery be given unrestricted access the files for the relevant period (1900–1949). Scarlett also was quite adamant that if James Bond had been real, he would not have been an agent, but a case officer, and that it was unthinkable that a mere agent would have so much autonomy, including a license to kill. It was published in 2010. A related study, The Defence of the Realm:  The Authorized History of MI5 by Christopher Andrew was published in 2009. His 1916: A Global History, published in 2015, looked at how twelve events from different arenas of war, including the Irish rebellion, reverberated around the world.  He died on 12 February 2016.

Selected bibliography
States of Emergency: British governments and strikebreaking since 1919 (London, 1983) (co-editor with Peter Hennessy)
The British Army and the crisis of Empire, 1918–1922 (Manchester, 1984).
The Military Correspondence of Field Marshal Sir Henry Wilson (Army Record Society, 1985) (Edited).
Northern Ireland since 1968 (Oxford, 1988) (co-author with Paul Arthur)
Men, Women, and War (Dublin, 1993) (co-editor with T. G. Fraser)
A military history of Ireland (Manchester, 1996) (co-editor with Thomas Bartlett)
An Irish empire? Aspects of Ireland and the British Empire (Manchester, 1996) (editor)
Ireland and the Great War (Cambridge, 2000)
The GPO and the Easter Rising (Dublin, 2006)
Field Marshal Sir Henry Wilson: a political soldier (Oxford, 2006)
MI6: The history of the Secret Intelligence Service, 1909–1949 (Bloomsbury, 2010) (published in the United States and Canada as The Secret History of MI6 [Penguin Press, 2010])
1916: A global history (Bloomsbury, 2015)

See also
British history
Irish history
British Empire
Secret Intelligence Service (MI6)
John Andrew Gallagher
Christopher Andrew

References

1952 births
2016 deaths
Academics of Queen's University Belfast
British historians
20th-century Irish historians
21st-century Irish historians
Members of the Royal Irish Academy
Alumni of St John's College, Cambridge
People educated at Methodist College Belfast